Tuni railway station (station code:TUNI) is an Indian Railways station in Tuni of East Godavari district in the Indian state of Andhra Pradesh. It lies on the Howrah–Chennai main line. It is administered under Vijayawada railway division of South Coast Railway zone (formerly South Central Railway zone). It is one of the 38 stations in the division to be equipped with Automatic Ticket Vending Machines (ATVMs).

History 
Between 1893 and 1896,  of the East Coast State Railway, between Vijayawada and Cuttack was opened for traffic. The southern part of the East Coast State Railway (from Waltair to Vijayawada) was taken over by Madras Railway in 1901.

Classification 
In terms of earnings and outward passengers handled, Tuni is categorized as a Non-Suburban Grade-4 (NSG-4) railway station. Based on the re–categorization of Indian Railway stations for the period of 2017–18 and 2022–23, an NSG–4 category station earns between – crore and handles  passengers.

References

External links 

Railway stations in East Godavari district
Vijayawada railway division